The Marcapata spinetail (Cranioleuca marcapatae) is a species of bird in the family Furnariidae. It is endemic to Peru.

Its natural habitat is subtropical or tropical moist montane forest.

References

Marcapata spinetail
Birds of the Peruvian Andes
Endemic birds of Peru
Marcapata spinetail
Marcapata spinetail
Taxonomy articles created by Polbot